Amtrak Express is Amtrak's freight and shipping service. It handles small package express service, heavy freight shipments and city-to-city freight shipping by private and commercial customers. Boxes up to 36" x 36" x 36" (maximum 50 pounds), suitcases, and boxed bicycles are acceptable, but numerous classes of fragile, valuable and hazardous items are not permitted. Large pallet shipments of up to 500 pounds (227 kg) are accepted at certain major stations. Quoted transit times range from 2 to 7 days depending on distance and service frequency.

Amtrak suspended shipping during the COVID-19 pandemic beginning October 1, 2020, and has not yet stated when it will resume

A message was posted on the website, "Amtrak Express shipping is suspended until further notice.".

Express service types 
Service is available between most Amtrak stations that handle checked baggage (over 130 cities). Service and hours vary widely by station, limited by available equipment and security considerations, and service is not available on all days at all stations.

 Light Express (LEX)
 Smaller stations with limited storage space that handle shipments of up to 250 pounds. Each piece may not exceed 36" x 36" x 36" in size or 50 pounds in weight.
 Regular Express (REX)
 The majority of Amtrak stations that handles small packages. Shipments to/from Regular Express stations are limited to 500 pounds (227 kg) total. Each piece may not exceed 36" x 36" x 36" in size or 50 pounds in weight.
 Heavy Express (HEX)
 Larger stations with forklifts or pallet jacks that can handle palletized shipments. Each piece may not exceed 36" x 36" x 36" in size or 50 pounds in weight. Pallets may not exceed 60" x 48" x 60" or 500 pounds.

Preparing the shipment 
Each piece in the shipment, including individual pieces shipped together on a pallets, must have a separate lot label (provided by Amtrak), and name, address and telephone number of the shipper and the consignee legibly marked or securely attached to the package.

Shipments must be in sturdy containers that will withstand ordinary care in handling. Shipments that may be susceptible to damage by conditions that may be encountered in transport (i.e., changes in temperature) must be adequately protected by proper packaging. Amtrak does not accept containers that are not sturdy or cannot hold contents, light rubber/plastic containers (heavy plastic shipping containers are permissible), trash bags or woven fabric zipper bags.

Shipment charges 
Amtrak Express charges are based on the total weight and distance of shipment. Large but lightweight pieces may be calculated using the item's Cubic Dimensional Weight. Express rates can be determined at any staffed Amtrak location through the reservation system or by calling the Amtrak Express Desk. Amtrak accepts cash or credit card for payment of Express charges. Payment is due at the time the shipment is dropped-off. 

Amtrak automatically assumes liability of $50 per shipment for loss or damage. Shippers may declare additional value of up to $2,000 for $1.00 per $100 of value declared, or up to $10,000 for $1.50 per $100 declared.

Shipments are held, without charge, for a period of 48 hours after arrival. Afterwards, storage will be charged at the rate of either $3.00 per 100 pounds, per 24 hours, or $4.00 per piece, per 24 hours (whichever is greater) until claimed.

Special items 
Some special items are exempt from maximum size per piece requirements, such as:

 Baby carriages, car seats, high chairs, playpens, portacribs and strollers (collapsible and boxed)
 Bicycles (including tricycles): Must fit into one bicycle box
 Golf bags (covered) and carts (must be separated)
 Luggage carts (separated from suitcases)
 Musical instruments (in suitable containers)
 Sample cases
 Scuba gear (tanks empty and in container)
 Skis and ski poles (in ski bags, on pair per bag)
 Snowboards (in suitable containers, one per container)
 Surfboards (wrapped and tied): 7-foot maximum on Pacific Surfliner
 Wheelchairs (folding)

Prohibited items 
The following prohibited items are not acceptable for shipment under any circumstances:

 Animals
 Appliances (larger items such as air conditioners, microwave ovens, etc.)
 Cameras and Photographic Accessories
 Controlled or Illegal Substances
 Dangerous or Hazardous Items (acidic or corrosive substances, ammunition, batteries containing acid, explosive, fireworks, flammable items, poison, radioactive materials, etc.)
 Electronic Equipment (radios, stereos, tape recorders, televisions, video cameras, video game systems, etc.)
 Eyeglasses or Contact Lenses
 Fragile Articles (antiques, art works, china, clocks, glassware, watches, etc.)
 Furniture or Mattresses
 Guns
 Liquids (except for properly packaged blood and plasma shipments by hospitals and laboratories)
 Medications and Prescriptions
 Motorized Vehicles and Engines
 Office-type Equipment (calculators, computers, printers, telephones, typewriters, etc.)
 Perishable Items (flowers, food, plants, etc.)
 Playground Equipment (swing sets, etc.)
 Poles used in pole vaulting
 Sailboards with Masts
 Valuable Items (credit cards, coin or stamp collections, gems and minerals, irreplaceable papers, photos or manuscripts, jewelry, money, stamps, stock certificates, watches, etc.) 
 Any other overweight item, or an item unsuitably packed or too fragile to withstand normal handling.

Human remains 
Amtrak accepts human remains at many stations that handle Amtrak Express. Undertakers must make prior arrangements with the Amtrak Express Desk.

References

External links
Amtrak Express

Express
Logistics companies of the United States